Jonathan Rosales (born May 22, 1998) is an American soccer player who plays as a defender.

Career

Youth and college
Rosales played for one season with the Orlando City development academy during the 2015–16 season, making 30 appearances and scoring two goals for the U-17/18 squad.

Rosales played college soccer at the University of South Florida from 2016 to 2019. After seeing no game time as a freshman, he made 46 appearances during three seasons for the Bulls. In the summers, Rosales returned to Orlando City to train at the facilities.

Orlando City B
Following the conclusion of his college career, Rosales returned to Orlando to sign a professional contract with Orlando City B, Orlando City's USL League One affiliate. He made his professional debut on August 1, 2020, coming on as a 62nd-minute substitute for Austin Amer in a 2–0 away defeat to Tormenta FC. He was released at the end of the season.

References

External links
Jonathan Rosales at USF Athletics
Jonathan Rosales at US Soccer Development Academy

1998 births
Living people
Orlando City B players
USL League One players
American soccer players
Soccer players from Florida
Sportspeople from Greater Orlando
Association football defenders
People from Kissimmee, Florida
South Florida Bulls men's soccer players